Rafael Nadal was the defending champion, but lost to Dominic Thiem in the semifinals.

Thiem went on to win the title, defeating Nicolás Almagro in the final, 7–6(7–2), 3–6, 7–6(7–4).

Seeds
The top four seeds receive a bye into the second round.

Draw

Finals

Top half

Bottom half

Qualifying

Seeds

Qualifiers

Lucky loser

Qualifying draw

First qualifier

Second qualifier

Third qualifier

Fourth qualifier

External links
 Main draw
 Qualifying draw

Argentina Open - Singles
ATP Buenos Aires